Younis Abed Ali (born 1968 in Al-Thawra, Baghdad) is an Iraqi former football forward who played for Iraq in the 1988 Summer Olympics in Seoul, 1988 Arab Nations Cup in Amman and 1989 Peace and Friendship Cup in Kuwait.

Club career
In 1979 Younis began playing for Academy of Al-Shorta Club, and in 1982 he moved to play for the Premier League beside the first team. In the 1985–86 season, he moved to Al-Rasheed Club to achieve his most successful titles. He won three Premier League titles, two FA Cup trophies, Arab Club Championship title and runner-up title of Asian Champions League. In the 1990–91 season, he returned to his first club Al-Shorta, winning the title of top scorer in the 1993–94 season. He scored 36 goals in 50 match as a record so far. In the 1997–98 season he moved to Al-Quwa Al-Jawiya and later moved to Al-Difaa Al-Jawi to retire in 2001; during those seasons, Younis scored 157 league goals.

International career
In 1984, Yunis started playing for the Iraq U16, and then played for the 1985 AFC U-16 Championship in Qatar.

He was called by coach Wathiq Naji to play in the 1988 AFC Youth Championship qualification in Maldives and then in the 1988 AFC Youth Championship in Qatar, he won the championship title with the team, and also won the top scorer title.

He was called by coach Ammo Baba to play in the 1988 Summer Olympics in Seoul, and under the leadership of the same coach, his first appearance with the national team was against Sudan in a friendly in 1987, then playing in the 1988 Arab Nations Cup in Amman, where he won the championship title with the team, he scored a goal against Jordan. He was called by coach Anwar Jassam to play in the 1989 Peace and Friendship Cup in Kuwait, where he won the championship title with the team.

International goals
Iraq national football team goals
Scores and results list Iraq's goal tally first.

Honors

Club
Al-Rasheed
 Iraqi Premier League: 1986–87, 1987–88, 1988–89
 Iraq FA Cup: 1986–87, 1987–88
 Arab Club Champions Cup: 1986
 Asian Champions League: 1988–89 as a runner-up

International
Iraq U20
 AFC Youth Championship: 1988
Iraq
 Arab Nations Cup: 1988
 Peace and Friendship Cup:  1989

Individual
 1993–94 Iraqi Premier League: top scorer (36 goals)
 1988 AFC Youth Championship: top scorer (23 goals)

References

External links
List of Iraqi Topscorers at rsssf.com
Managerial profile's on kooora.com

1968 births
Living people
Association football forwards
Iraqi footballers
Al-Shorta SC players
Al-Shorta SC managers
Al-Quwa Al-Jawiya players
Sportspeople from Baghdad
Iraq international footballers
Olympic footballers of Iraq
Footballers at the 1988 Summer Olympics
Iraqi football managers